USS LST-928/Cameron (APB-50) was an  in the United States Navy. Like many of her class, she was not named and is properly referred to by her hull designation.

Construction
LST-928 was laid down on 1 June 1944, at Hingham, Massachusetts, by the Bethlehem-Hingham Shipyard; launched on 5 July 1944; and commissioned on 30 July 1944.

Service history
During World War II, LST-928 was assigned to the Asiatic-Pacific theater and participated in the assault and occupation of Iwo Jima in March 1945.

She was decommissioned on 13 December 1946, and laid up in the Pacific Reserve Fleet, Puget Sound Naval Shipyard, Bremerton, Washington. On 1 July 1955, she was reclassified as a Self-propelled Barracks Ship and renamed Cameron (APB-50). She was sold to Pacific Inland Navigation Co., for $131,000, in 1959, for hauling freight on the Columbia River. She was removed from the fleet on 1 October 1959. She was scrapped in 1960.

Awards
LST-928 earned one battle star for World War II service.
American Campaign Medal
Asiatic-Pacific Campaign Medal with campaign star
World War II Victory Medal

Notes

Citations

Bibliography 

Online resources

External links
 

 

LST-542-class tank landing ships
World War II amphibious warfare vessels of the United States
Ships built in Hingham, Massachusetts
1944 ships
Pacific Reserve Fleet, Bremerton Group
Benewah-class barracks ships
Cameron Parish, Louisiana
Cameron County, Pennsylvania
Cameron County, Texas